The 2021 Yukon general election was held on April 12, 2021 to return members of the 35th Yukon Legislative Assembly. The election resulted in a hung parliament where the incumbent governing Yukon Liberal Party and the opposition Yukon Party won 8 seats each, while the Yukon New Democratic Party held the remaining 3. As the incumbent party given the first opportunity to form government, a Liberal minority government was sworn in on April 23, 2021. The Liberals and NDP announced the establishment of a formal confidence and supply agreement on April 28, 2021.

During the 2016 election, the Liberals included a commitment in their platform to introduce fixed election dates in the territory. In October 2020, the government introduced legislation to amend the Elections Act and create fixed election dates. The legislation passed in December 2020, and took effect after the 2021 election. 

Voter turnout dropped almost twelve percentage points compared to 2016, caused to an extent by the introduction of a standing List of Electors, resulting in a higher percentage of Yukoners being registered. More votes were cast than in 2016, in part due to the territory's strong population growth since the last election.

Results
The final seat standing for the election was only resolved on April 19, 2021, because of a 78-78 vote tie in the Vuntut Gwitchin riding, the territory's smallest by population. After the tie was upheld by a judicial recount, drawing of lots gave the seat to the NDP's Annie Blake, denying the Yukon Liberals a one seat plurality over the Yukon Party.
|- style="background:#ccc;"
! rowspan="2" colspan="2" style="text-align:left;"|Party
! rowspan="2" style="text-align:left;"|Party leader
!rowspan="2"|Candidates
! colspan="4" style="text-align:center;"|Seats
!colspan="3" style="text-align:center;"|Popular vote
|- 
!2016
!Dissol.
!2021
!+/-
!#
!%
!+/-

|align=left|Currie Dixon
|align="right"|18
|align="right"|6
|align="right"|6
|align="right"|8
|align="right"|+2
|align="right"|7,477
|align="right"|39.32%
|align="right"|+5.84%

|align=left|Sandy Silver
|align="right"|19
|align="right"|11
|align="right"|10
|align="right"|8
|align="right"|-3
|align="right"|6,155
|align="right"|32.37%
|align="right"|-7.04%

|align=left|Kate White
|align="right"|18
|align="right"|2
|align="right"|2
|align="right"|3
|align="right"|+1
|align="right"|5,356
|align="right"|28.17%
|align="right"|+1.94%

| colspan="2" style="text-align:left;"|Independent
|align="right"|1
|align="right"|0
|align="right"|1
|align="right"|0
|align="right"|0
|align="right"|26
|align="right"|0.14%
|align="right"|-0.06%
|-
| style="text-align:left;" colspan="3"|Invalid votes
| style="text-align:right;"| -
| style="text-align:right;"| -
| style="text-align:right;"| -
| style="text-align:right;"| -
| style="text-align:right;"| -
| style="text-align:right;"|84
| style="text-align:right;"| -
| style="text-align:right;"| -
|-
| style="text-align:left;" colspan="3"|Total
| style="text-align:right;"|56
| style="text-align:right;"|19
| style="text-align:right;"|19
| style="text-align:right;"|19
| style="text-align:right;"|-
| style="text-align:right;"|19,098
| style="text-align:right;"|100%
| style="text-align:right;"|
|-
| style="text-align:left;" colspan="3"|Registered voters/turnout
| style="text-align:right;"| -
| style="text-align:right;"| -
| style="text-align:right;"| -
| style="text-align:right;"| -
| style="text-align:right;"| -
| style="text-align:right;"| 29,637
| style="text-align:right;"| 64.44%
| style="text-align:right;"| -
|}

Results by Riding
Each candidate stands in a single electoral district.

Bold indicates party leaders and cabinet members are italicized
† - denotes a retiring incumbent MLA

Rural Yukon

|-
| style="background:whitesmoke;"|Klondike
|| ||Sandy Silver526 (47.2%)
| ||Charlie Dagostin364 (32.7%)
| ||Chris Clarke224 (20.1%)
|| ||Sandy Silver
|-
| style="background:whitesmoke;"|Kluane
| ||Luke Campbell219 (28.0%)
|| ||Wade Istchenko352 (45.0%)
| ||Dave Weir211 (27.0%)
|| ||Wade Istchenko
|-
| style="background:whitesmoke;"|Lake Laberge
| ||Tracey Jacobs229 (17.8%)
|| ||Brad Cathers799 (62.1%)
| ||Ian Angus259 (20.1%)
|| ||Brad Cathers
|-
| style="background:whitesmoke;"|Mayo-Tatchun
|| ||Jeremy Harper238 (37.7%)
| ||Peter Grundmanis186 (29.4%)
| ||Patty Wallingham208 (32.9%)
|| ||Don Hutton†
|-
| style="background:whitesmoke;"|Mount Lorne-Southern Lakes
|| ||John Streicker446 (39.0%)
| ||Eric Schroff406 (35.5%)
| ||Erik Pinkerton292 (25.5%)
|| ||John Streicker
|-
| style="background:whitesmoke;"|Pelly-Nisutlin
| ||Katherine Alexander97 (13.6%)
|| ||Stacey Hassard362 (50.8%)
| ||George Bahm254 (35.6%)
|| ||Stacey Hassard
|-
| style="background:whitesmoke;"|Vuntut Gwitchin
| ||Pauline Frost78 (50.0%)
| ||
|| ||Annie Blake78 (50.0%)
|| ||Pauline Frost
|-
| style="background:whitesmoke;"|Watson Lake
| ||Amanda Brown237 (43.1%)
|| ||Patti McLeod313 (56.9%)
| ||
|| ||Patti McLeod
|}
In Vuntut Gwitchin, both candidates each received 78 votes, resulting in a tie. A judicial recount took place and there remained a tie vote therefore, a random draw determined that Annie Blake would fill the seat.

Whitehorse

|-
| style="background:whitesmoke;"|Copperbelt North
| ||Ted Adel346 (25.1%)
|| ||Currie Dixon717 (51.9%)
| ||Saba Javed318 (23.0%)
| ||
|| ||Ted Adel
|-
| style="background:whitesmoke;"|Copperbelt South
| ||Sheila Robertson259 (20.3%)
|| ||Scott Kent726 (57.0%)
| ||Kaori Torigai289 (22.7%)
| ||
|| ||Scott Kent
|-
| style="background:whitesmoke;"|Mountainview
|| ||Jeanie McLean402 (38.2%)
| ||Ray Sydney268 (25.5%)
| ||Michelle Friesen356 (33.8%)
| ||Coach Jan Prieditis26 (2.5%)
|| ||Jeanie McLean
|-
| style="background:whitesmoke;"|Porter Creek Centre
| ||Paolo Gallina646 (38.4%)
|| ||Yvonne Clarke704 (41.8%)
| ||Shonagh McCrindle334 (19.8%)
| ||
|| ||Paolo Gallina
|-
| style="background:whitesmoke;"|Porter Creek North
| ||Staci McIntosh331 (28.9%)
|| ||Geraldine Van Bibber562 (49.2%)
| ||Francis van Kessel250 (21.9%)
| ||
|| ||Geraldine Van Bibber
|-
| style="background:whitesmoke;"|Porter Creek South
|| ||Ranj Pillai309 (47.2%)
| ||Chad Sjodin262 (40.0%)
| ||Colette Acheson84 (12.8%)
| ||
|| ||Ranj Pillai
|-
| style="background:whitesmoke;"|Riverdale North
|| ||Nils Clarke469 (41.7%)
| ||Cory Adams280 (24.9%)
| ||Vanessa Thorson375 (33.4%)
| ||
|| ||Nils Clarke
|-
| style="background:whitesmoke;"|Riverdale South
|| ||Tracy-Anne McPhee415 (39.3%)
| ||Cynthia Lyslo307 (29.1%)
| ||Jason Cook334 (31.6%)
| ||
|| ||Tracy-Anne McPhee
|-
| style="background:whitesmoke;"|Takhini-Kopper King
| ||Raj Murugaiyan198 (16.4%)
| ||Morgan Yuill244 (20.3%)
|| ||Kate White763 (63.3%)
| ||
|| ||Kate White
|-
| style="background:whitesmoke;"|Whitehorse Centre
| ||Dan Curtis312 (29.5%)
| ||Eileen Melnychuk249 (23.5%)
|| ||Emily Tredger498 (47.0%)
| ||
|| ||Liz Hanson†
|-
| style="background:whitesmoke;"|Whitehorse West
|| ||Richard Mostyn398 (39.7%)
| ||Angela Drainville376 (37.5%)
| ||Ron Davis229 (22.8%)
| ||
|| ||Richard Mostyn
|}

The Yukon Green Party did not run any candidates in the election; as a result, the party has been deregistered by Elections Yukon.

Incumbent MLAs who were defeated

Opinion polls

Aftermath
The election resulted in a hung parliament, with no party winning the requisite 10 seats to form a majority in the legislature. The Yukon Party and the Liberals, with 8 seats each, entered discussions with the NDP to determine support for a minority government. The Liberals, as the incumbent governing party, were given the first opportunity to form a government and test the confidence of the legislature. The Yukon Party publicly stated that they were not included in any talks to form a coalition government or provide other support to the Liberals, while the NDP did not indicate the content of their leader's discussion with the Liberals. On April 28, 2021, the Liberals and NDP announced a formal confidence and supply agreement to allow the Liberals to form a minority government.

Following the tie vote in Vuntut Gwitchin, which declared NDP candidate Annie Blake as the winner following the drawing of lots, outgoing Liberal MLA Pauline Frost filed a legal challenge challenging the results; Frost initially claimed that two votes had been counted from the district that "should not have been cast." Only one vote was actually formally challenged by Frost in court, on the grounds that as a prisoner in the Whitehorse Correctional Centre the voter should have registered to vote in Whitehorse rather than his home community; the challenge was rejected by Suzanne Duncan of the Supreme Court of Yukon in August, affirming Blake's victory.

Notes

References 

Elections in Yukon
Election
Yukon general election